Tetairoa McMillan (born April 5, 2003) is an American football wide receiver for the Arizona Wildcats.

High school career
McMillan attended Servite High School in Anaheim, California. As a senior, he was a finalist for the Gatorade Football Player of the Year after he had 88 receptions for 1,302 yards and 18 touchdowns. For his career, he had 179 receptions for 2,640 yards and 34 touchdowns. McMillan was selected to play in the 2022 All-American Bowl. A five-star recruit,he originally committed to the University of Oregon to play college football before switching to the University of Arizona. He was the highest rated recruit in the history of the school.

College career
McMillan earned immediate playing time his true freshman year at Arizona in 2022. In his first career game, he had three receptions for 53 yards and a touchdown in the 38–20 victory over San Diego State. On October 15 against Washington, he had seven receptions for 132 yards and two touchdowns in the 49–39 loss. He finished the 2022 season with 39 receptions for 702 receiving yards and eight receiving touchdowns.

References

External links
Arizona Wildcats bio

Living people
Players of American football from California
American football wide receivers
Arizona Wildcats football players
2003 births